Zhang Qing is a fictional character in Water Margin, one of the Four Great Classical Novels in Chinese literature. Nicknamed "Gardener", he ranks 102nd among the 108 Stars of Destiny and 66th among the 72 Earthly Fiends.

Background
The novel depicts Zhang Qing as odd-looking with some hair on his face. He works as a gardener of a monastery in his native city of Mengzhou. One day, following a heated quarrel, he kills the monks in a fit of anger and burns down the monastery. He flees to the Cross Slope (十字坡; at the intersection of present-day Shen County, Shandong and Fan County, Henan) where he robs passers-by. One day, he sets upon an elderly man who comes by. After fighting and defeating him, the man takes him to his home and teaches him martial arts. He even marries his daughter Sun Erniang to him.

After his father-in-law died, Zhang Qing settles with his wife at Cross Slope where they run an inn. They knock out customers with drugged wine, take their valuables and butcher them to make filling in buns with their flesh. Although he is brutal, Zhang has advised his wife not to kill three sorts of people, namely, exiles as many among them are heroes; monks as they are lead an ascetic life; and prostitutes because they suffer many abuses. But Sun does not always follow his advice and may kill anyone according to her whims.

Meeting Lu Zhishen
When Lu Zhishen passes by Cross Slope after leaving the imperial capital Dongjing to escape arrest by Grand Marshal Gao Qiu for thwarting his plan to murder Lin Chong, he eats in Sun Erniang's inn and is knocked out. Just when Sun is about to butcher the monk, Zhang Qing returns in time and stops her noticing Lu's unusual appearance. After reviving Lu and determining his identity, Zhang Qing suggests that he seek refuge with the outlaw band led by Deng Long at Mount Twin Dragons. Deng, however, blocks Lu‘s way to the stronghold. Lu kills and replaces him after getting into it with a ruse.

Encounters with Wu Song
Later Wu Song, exiled to Mengzhou for killing his sister-in-law and her adulterer lover Ximen Qing to avenge their murder of his brother, also comes by Cross Slope on his way and eats in Sun Erniang's inn. Sensing that Sun is up to no good, Wu pretends to fall unconscious just like his two escorts after having a few cups. But Sun's helpers could not lift him as Wu controls his breath to make himself heavy as iron. So Sun comes up to do the work herself. But Wu surprises her when he uses a grappling hold to pin her down. Just then Zhang Qing comes back and stops the scuffle. The couple apologise upon learning the fellow is the tiger slayer Wu Song. The couple treat Wu as an honoured guest until he leaves for Mengzhou.

After being framed for theft and nearly murdered in Mengzhou, Wu Song kills Inspector Zhang Mengfang, Instructor Zhang and Jiang the Door God, who were behind the schemes. He also massacres the family of Inspector Zhang. On his run Wu Song is seized while sleeping in a temple by some men of Zhang Qing. He is released when Zhang recognises him. Sun Erniang proposes that Wu join Lu Zhishen at Mount Twin Dragons. Sun had earlier, in a rash act, butchered an untonsured Buddhist priest, who left behind a Buddhist robe, a pair of swords, a necklace of skulls and a head band. Sun suggests that Wu dress himselfup with these articles to look like an itinerant priest with his hair let down to cover the tattoo mark of exile on his face, Wu thus travels safely to Mount Twin Dragons. Sun Erniang and Zhang Qing later also wind up their business and join the stronghold.

After his defeat by the bandits of Liangshan Marsh in his military attack to exterminate them, the imperial general Huyan Zhuo flees to Qingzhou (in present-day Shandong) in hopes of redeeming himself by wiping out the bandits there. Mount Twin Dragons, one of the strongholds, concludes that Huyan is a tough opponent and seeks help from Liangshan. Song Jiang comes to Qingzhou with a force and captures Huyan. The bandits of Mount Twin Dragons, including Zhang Qing and his wife, are absorbed into Liangshan.

Campaigns and death
Zhang Qing and his wife are put in charge of an inn which acts as a lookout for Liangshan after the 108 Stars of Destiny came together in what is called the Grand Assembly. He participates in the campaigns against the Liao invaders and rebel forces in Song territory following amnesty from Emperor Huizong for Liangshan.

Zhang Qing is killed in the battle of Shezhou in the campaign against Fang La.

References
 
 
 
 
 
 
 

72 Earthly Fiends
Fictional characters from Henan